Pryazha is an urban locality (an urban-type settlement) and the administrative center of Pryazhinsky District of the Republic of Karelia, Russia, located  from the Shuya River and  west of Petrozavodsk, the capital of the republic. As of the 2010 Census, its population was 3,675.

History
It was first mentioned in the 17th century as the village of Pryazha or Padlovo. It was granted urban-type settlement status in 1962.

Administrative and municipal status
Within the framework of administrative divisions, Pryazha serves as the administrative center of Pryazhinsky District, of which it is a part. As a municipal division, Pryazha, together with three rural localities, is incorporated within Pryazhinsky Municipal District as Pryazhinskoye Urban Settlement.

Tourism
The Blue Highway, an international tourist route, starts in Mo i Rana, Norway, goes through Sweden and Finland, and then through Pryazha, before ending in Pudozh.

References

Notes

Sources

Urban-type settlements in the Republic of Karelia
Pryazhinsky District
Petrozavodsky Uyezd